Lake Kedron is a  reservoir in Peachtree City, Georgia. It holds about 1 billion gallons of 
water.  It is located on the north side of the city, within the village of Kedron. Recreational fishing is allowed with a license, but swimming is prohibited. Lake Kedron is a manmade lake formed by a portion of Flat Creek along with other smaller channels of water flowing into it. At its dam, Lake Kedron drains into Flat Creek, which continues through the heart of Peachtree City by feeding Lake Peachtree and then merging with Line Creek southwest of the town.

References

Bodies of water of Fayette County, Georgia
Kedron